Heath is an unincorporated community in Fergus County, in the U.S. state of Montana.

History
Heath contained a post office between the years 1910 and 1963. The community was named for Perry Heath, owner of a local ranch.

References

Unincorporated communities in Fergus County, Montana
Unincorporated communities in Montana